Under the Counter is the third studio album by Welsh rap group Goldie Lookin Chain.  It was released on 17 March 2008 under Shellshock Records, after the group were dropped from their previous label, Warner Music Group. It contains various demos and songs left over from the recording sessions of the previous two albums.

Track listing
"Adam on the Phone"
"The Take Over"
"Hardcore Exchange"
"House Party"
"Eddie the Wrestler"
"Majic Dusty"
"Maggot Chant"
"The Nugget"
"Lloyd Ganja 9t9s Lament"
"Amsterdamage"
"Minimoto"
"Spaceman"
"Song for Kelly"

References

2008 albums
Goldie Lookin Chain albums